Jessie Vihrog (19 October 1906 – 1 January 1996) was a South African-born German film actress.

Selected filmography
 The Wrong Husband (1931)
 Hooray, It's a Boy! (1931)
 Contest (1932)
 The Ladies Diplomat (1932)
 Things Are Getting Better Already (1932)
 Two Good Comrades (1933)
 The Castle in the South (1933)
 A Song for You (1933)
 The Gentleman from Maxim's (1933)
 Charley's Aunt (1934)
 The Brenken Case (1934)
 The Girlfriend of a Big Man (1934)
 Decoy (1934)
 The Sun Rises (1934)
 A Woman with Power of Attorney (1934)
 Frisians in Peril (1935)
 The Decoy (1935)
 Don't Lose Heart, Suzanne! (1935)
 Street Music (1936)

References

Bibliography

External links

1906 births
1996 deaths
South African film actresses
German film actresses
South African emigrants to Germany
People from Kimberley, Northern Cape